The Rao Birender Singh State Institute of Engineering & Technology, Rewari (Hindi: राव बीरेंद्र सिंह राजकीय अभियांत्रिकी एवं प्रौद्योगिकी संस्थान, रेवाड़ी) (abbreviated RBSSIETR) is a public government engineering institution located in Zainabad,Rewari. It is among the four engineering college run by the Government of Haryana, the other being Ch. Devi Lal State Institute of Engineering & Technology, Sirsa ,  State Institute of Engineering & Technology, Nilokheri (Karnal)  and Ch. Ranbir Singh State Institute of Engineering & Technology, Jhajjar.

History 
Rao Birender Singh State Institute of Engineering & Technology, Rewari was earlier known as Govt Engineering College Zainabad,Rewari Haryana is also known as RBS Engineering College Zainabad. Rao Birender Singh Govt. Engineering College zainabad, Rewari, Haryana proposed in 2013 and its foundation stone was laid in 2014.

References

Engineering colleges in Haryana